Pristimantis helvolus (in Spanish: rana pierniamarilla) is a species of frog in the family Strabomantidae.
It is endemic to Colombia.
Its natural habitat is tropical moist montane forests.
It is threatened by habitat loss.

Sources

helvolus
Amphibians of Colombia
Endemic fauna of Colombia
Amphibians described in 1998
Taxonomy articles created by Polbot